The women's keirin competition of the cycling events at the 2015 Pan American Games was held on July 17 at the Milton Velodrome in Milton, Ontario

Schedule
All times are Eastern Daylight Time (UTC-4).

Results

First round

Heat 1

Heat 2

Finals

Finals 7–12

Finals 1–6

References

Track cycling at the 2015 Pan American Games
Women's keirin
Pan